Michael Patrick Grant  (born 24 January 1963) is an Australian judge, who has been the Chief Justice of the Northern Territory since 2016.

Grant was born in Darwin in 1963, and educated at St Joseph's College, Hunters Hill in Sydney. He graduated with a Bachelor of Laws with first class honours from the University of Queensland. He practised as a solicitor from 1993, while also working as a lecturer in torts and taxation law at Northern Territory University.

In 1997, Grant worked as director of litigation in the office of the Attorney-General of the Northern Territory. In 1999, he joined William Forster Chambers as a barrister, and was made Queen's Counsel in 2006. From September 2007 to July 2016, Grant was Solicitor-General of the Northern Territory. He was appointed as Chief Justice in July 2016.

References

1963 births
Living people
Chief Justices of the Northern Territory
Australian King's Counsel
Australian barristers
Australian solicitors
Officers of the Order of Australia
Academic staff of Charles Darwin University
People educated at St Joseph's College, Hunters Hill
University of Queensland alumni